Sara Calaway (born July 21, 1977) in Long Beach, California, is a retired American model, professional wrestler, and valet. She was the wife The Undertaker as she managed him in the World Wrestling Federation from 2001 to 2002.

Professional wrestling career 
Sara made her debut in the WWF in series of footage shot by a stalker, the first being played May 28, 2001 on Raw. After weeks of stalker footage on June 18, 2001, RAW, Diamond Dallas Page revealed himself as the man who has been stalking The Undertaker's wife. This to a feud between Undertaker and DDP. The feud ended on August 20, 2001 RAW Sara defeated Diamond Dallas Page with help from Undertaker. After September 2001 Sara Calaway quietly disappeared from WWF Television. 
	
Following her appearance in WWE she featured in the Divas magazine and on the DVD entitled, WWF Divas: Tropical Pleasure. 
	
Visibly pregnant, she appeared on the September 12, 2002 episode of SmackDown! where she was confronted by Brock Lesnar and his manager Paul Heyman. Lesnar placed his hand on Sara's stomach and told her that "Life's a bitch!". The following week, Undertaker responded by saying "Payback's a Bitch" and giving a chokeslam and tombstone piledriver to Brock Lesnar.

Personal life 
Sara met Undertaker (Mark Calaway) at a WWE(then WWF) autograph signing. They have two daughters, Chasey and Gracie. Mark also has one son with his first wife Jodi Lynn. Sara was also a high school cheerleader and may have joined the girl's wrestling team. They divorced on April 24, 2007. She got married in December 2010 to her husband, Smith.

References

External links

1977 births
Living people
American female professional wrestlers
American stunt performers
Sportspeople from Los Angeles
Professional wrestling managers and valets
Professional wrestlers from California
21st-century American women